Sea transport accounts for most of the European Union external and internal commerce. The EU is the world's third-largest importer of fisheries and aquaculture products and the fifth-largest producer. Maritime borders make up more than 70% of the Union's external borders, and hundreds of millions of travelers pass through European ports each year. The security of Europe's energy supply is heavily reliant on marine transit and infrastructure.
The significant expansion of EU Member States' fleets, as well as suitable port infrastructure, contribute to a well-functioning energy market and supply security, and hence to European residents' and the European economy's overall well-being. The Arctic region is therefore a vital new area for the EU to work towards and a new strategy for the Arctic region that matches with the European green deal was established in late 2021.

Reason for an EU Engagement in the Arctic 
The increased interest in the  Arctic region is shared by several actors, mainly states that have large energy and export needs. States that are far from the region are starting to set up strategies for the Arctic giving the region a higher status in international relations. The underlying reason for the increased interest in the Arctic can be traced to two phenomena, technological developments making the region easier to access and recourse extraction easier to make profitable in the harsh arctic climate. Second, the rising temperatures globally are having an enormous effect on the Arctic region, opening for easier recourse extraction as well as new trade routes between the Pacific and European/North American region. The new trade routes that are possible to navigate through are seen as vital for making the global trade network less vulnerable to accidents in bottlenecks as the Suez Canal or in the Strait of Malacca.

The EU Arctic Policy 
The European Union have since 2008 established and worked on policies and strategies for the Arctic region. These policies are meant to encompass a wide range of areas as well as meeting the increased geopolitical and economic relevance of the region. The Arctic region is expected to hold vast economic recourses and will be a region with increased political importance in the coming years. The EU has one of the largest markets in the world and is close to the Arctic, with three member states (Denmark, Finland, and Sweden) being Arctic states and one of them (Denmark) being an arctic coastal state. As a geopolitical and economic force, the EU reclassifies the region's strategic importance, as well as the need of having a coordinated arctic policy for the entire European Union. The European Union needs to have a strategy for the Arctic since the region is becoming more accessible due to melting ice caps that will enable more trade and shorter trade routes from the Pacific region to the Atlantic region. To remain relevant in new political, security, and economic domains, the EU must follow the rising interest from other parties in the area. The arctic policies of the European Union are the policies and strategies of the European union regarding the arctic region. Three policies have been established by the European union, the first one in 2008 called "European Parliament Resolution of 9 October on Arctic governance", the last Arctic strategy document published by the EU was done in October 2021, this communication is called "A stronger EU engagement for a peaceful, sustainable and prosperous Arctic".

The European Union has since 2016 three main goals with its arctic policies:

 protecting and preserving the Arctic in unison with its population,
 promoting the sustainable use of resources,
 international cooperation.

The European Union does not have observer status within the Arctic Council. This has previously been blocked by Canada because of European Union import and trade bans on seal products. Lately Russia have been reluctant to invite the European Union as an observer as well, mainly due to European Union sanctions towards Russia for the 2014 annexation of Crimea. Since the Russian invasion of Ukraine, the European Union has increased the scope of its sanctions to unprecedented levels, possibly making it harder for the EU to be accepted into the Arctic Council as an observer state.

Future Developments for the EU in the Arctic 
If Iceland joins the European Union, the EU's Arctic influence will grow, and the EU may win permanent observer status in the Arctic Council. The Northern Dimension of European Union policy, which was founded in the late 1990s, was created to address concerns relating to western Russia as well as to improve overall collaboration between the EU, Iceland, and Norway. Since then, the EU, Iceland, Norway, and Russia have formed a multilateral, equal relationship. Since Russia's and the EU's ties have deteriorated, the agreement's continuation is uncertain. The cooperation has observers from Canada and the United States. Three members of the Nordic Council have joined the EU (Denmark in 1973 and Sweden & Finland in 1995). In reaction to the European Union's prohibition on the importation of seal goods, Canada vetoed the European Union's bid to become a "permanent observer" in the Arctic Council in 2009

History 
Although power competition has intensified over the last years within the Arctic region (e.g., the unified suspension of cooperation following Russian aggression directed at Ukraine (in 2014 and 2022), the Post-Cold War Arctic region has been relatively stable in terms of geopolitical struggles and has even constituted an enclave where Western states have been able to cooperate more freely with Russia than what has been the case within other domains.

Between 2007-2012 
The Arctic is becoming more strategically important. The European Union is dedicated to fostering effective Arctic cooperation and aiding with the region's current issues. The European Union is one of the most outspoken supporters of stronger international climate change policies. Three Arctic Council member nations are among its members (possibly four if Iceland joins the European Union). The European Union imports and exports a substantial number of Arctic resources and commodities. As a result, many of the union's policies and legislation affect Arctic stakeholders. The European Union wants to engage more with Arctic partners so that it can better understand their concerns and collaborate on solutions to common problems.
It is during the period the three objectives with the arctic policy is developed:
•	protecting and preserving the Arctic in unison with its population,
•	promoting the sustainable use of resources,
•	international cooperation.
As climate change and economic growth in the Arctic area accelerate, the European Union plans to significantly increase its engagement with its Arctic partners in order to jointly face the challenge of environmental protection while assuring the region's long-term prosperity. The Commission and High Representative are proposing to focus further development of the EU's policy towards the Arctic on three key areas:
1.	Supporting research and channel knowledge to address the challenges of environmental and climate changes in the Arctic,
2.	Acting with responsibility to contribute to ensuring economic development in the Arctic is based on sustainable use of resources and environmental expertise, 
3.	Intensifying its constructive engagement and dialogue with Arctic States, indigenous peoples, and other partners.

Between 2012-2016 
The Union has had the position of "permanent guest" since 2013, after thirteen years of being given "ad hoc observer" status, which implies it may follow the council's activity like permanent "observers" - yet this is only evidence of discriminatory diplomatic treatment. This is a prestige failure for the European Union considering that three of the Arctic 8 are members of the European Union and two are associate states; and it's all the more incongruent given that the European Union has membership status in other regional and global intergovernmental organizations dealing with Arctic concerns. The arctic region is a region that almost everyone has identified as a sentinel area for climate change. The European Union was quick to declare climate change a priority of its Arctic strategy, since it was already one of three objectives in the 2016 integrated Arctic policy, along with sustainable development and international collaboration. 
The joint communication of 2012 was divided into two parts. The two-part document provides a set of building blocks for the EU's increased involvement in the Arctic, as well as an overview of developments and policy actions achieved since the European Commission's initial message in 2008 . It also identifies three crucial areas for the EU's future Arctic participation: "knowledge, accountability, and engagement".

Between 2016-2022 
As the EU High Representative for Foreign Affairs and Security Policy, Josep Borrell, told, updating the Arctic Policy will be part of the European Green Deal, it is important to consider the level of priority given to the climate issue in relation to other Arctic priorities in the new communication of 2021. The EU's strategy for achieving its goal of zero net greenhouse gas emissions by 2050 is in other words strongly reflected in its updated arctic policy of 2021 as well . It is however evident that the EU sustainability goals can clash with arctic states goals, potentially opening for potential diplomatic disputes of recourse extraction vs. preservation

The number of countries interested in the Arctic region has risen dramatically in recent years. This increases the risk of turning the Arctic into a geopolitical battleground, putting the EU's interests at risk. In many places of the Arctic, military action has increased in tandem with rising interest in Arctic resources and transport routes. The EU is dedicated to maintaining a secure, stable, sustainable, and prosperous Arctic, which must remain a low-tension zone characterised by peaceful multilateral cooperation. The EU Council recognised the relevance of environmental concerns and climate change for security and defense in its conclusions on climate and energy diplomacy from January 2018, as well as the necessity for close cooperation with partner nations and international organisations.

EU Formal and Informal Influence 
Building on its policy as set out in previous Joint Communications on Arctic matters, and based on the 2016 Global Strategy for the European Union's Foreign and Security Policy and the political priorities of the commission, the EU will strengthen its Arctic engagement through: 
 contributing to maintaining peaceful and constructive dialogue and cooperation in a changing geopolitical landscape, to keep the Arctic safe and stable, by raising Arctic matters in its external contacts, intensifying regional cooperation, and developing strategic foresight on emerging security challenges,
 addressing the ecological, social, economic, and political challenges arising because of climate change and taking strong action to tackle climate change and environmental degradation, making the Arctic more resilient, through environmental legislation, concerted action on black carbon and permafrost thaw, and by pushing for oil, coal and gas to stay in the ground, including in Arctic regions, 
 supporting the inclusive and sustainable development of the Arctic regions to the benefit of its inhabitants and future generations, focusing on the needs of Indigenous Peoples, women and the young, and investing in future-orientated jobs and the blue economy.

The EU has considerable geopolitical, geo-economic, and geo-ecological interests in the Arctic, according to scholars. Cooperation in the fight against climate change, increased maritime activity (new and quicker trade routes), namely the opening of the northern sea route (NSR) and access to new resources all present significant strategic potential, especially extraction of hydrocarbon resources. On the one hand, the EU's participation in the Arctic is characterised by an excessive diversity of sectors and policy goals across issue areas as fishing, environmental cooperation, etc., and on the other, security challenges and contradictory policy issues pushed by EU actors in the Arctic Its impact in the North will be determined by its policies as well as the attitudes of other countries, who may or may not welcome the European Union's presence.

EU Actions to Establish a Physical Presence in the Arctic Region

Research in the Arctic 
The European Union has since the first Arctic policy of 2008 worked towards legitimizing itself as an actor in the Arctic. However, the EU is not an obvious Arctic actor, this is stated  by many academic scholars as well as reflected in the reluctance of the Arctic Council members to incorporate the European Union into the Arctic Council or as an observer state. Another challenge for the European Union is internal cohesion concerning the Arctic, balancing sustainability goals and environmental preservation on the one hand and the possibilities for the extraction of natural recourses on the other.
The European Union has focused much of its investments in the Arctic towards research, using its vast recourses to take on a central guiding and coordinating role in Arctic research.

While simultaneously focus the majority of its recourses on the parts of the Arctic region that fall under the EU and its Arctic members states responsibility. These topics include combating climate change, developing alternative energy resources, and strengthening bilateral connections with Arctic littoral states and indigenous peoples. Only one sector, the EU's satellite project Galileo, has provided a clear illustration of EU presence in the Arctic, which the Arctic governments have embraced. As a result, the EU has a chance to strengthen and legitimise its presence in the Arctic by establishing a cooperative Search and Rescue (SAR) regime backed by its Galileo and Sentinel satellites programmes. The satellite programmes could therefore help implement a new Arctic Search and Rescue arrangement and therefore contribute to the EU's goal to build increased monitoring and surveillance capabilities in the Arctic region, further increasing its authority in the region. The satellite programmes could therefore help implement a new Arctic Search and Rescue arrangement and therefore contribute to the EU's goal to build increased monitoring and surveillance capabilities in the Arctic region, further increasing its authority in the region.

European External Action Service (EEAS) Opening Office in Nuuk 
An important step to take for the EU to increase its presence in the Arctic Region as well as fostering its relations with Greenland was to open a permanent representation in the Greenlandic capitol of Nuuk. Since the EU arctic strategy of 2021 is closely linked to the European "green deal" this office will mainly work for implementing this policy. Mainly working towards attempting to keep hydrocarbon exploitation to a minimum . This can be challenging for the EU since Russia has invested large recourses in the development of infrastructure to facilitate oil and gas exploitation in the Arctic. The presence of and EU representation office in Nuuk will help the EU build stronger ties with the actors in the region, as well as help it anticipate moves by competitors, giving the EU a legitimate reason to have a stake in Arctic matters

EU Developments in the arctic and possible challenges 
The academic literature identifies both possibilities and problems that the European Union will encounter in the Arctic. The number of actors who wish to have a say in polar issues is already increasing in the Arctic area. Scholars, on the other hand, believe that a clash between these players is unlikely. These academics conclude that this is due to the region's remoteness, the climate itself and the challenges tied to patrolling and surveillance that all promotes cooperation rather than conflict. However, we have yet to thoroughly assess the dangers of spill over effects from the Russian-Ukrainian war, so future collaboration in the Arctic cannot be assumed. Russia and Canada have already expressed reservations about the EU establishing a significant presence in the region. The essential question will be whether the EU is perceived as a positive participant and a useful partner.

See also 
 European Neighbourhood Policy
 Arctic Cooperation and Politics
 Northern Sea Route

References

External links 
 European Commission Website
 EU-EEAS Arctic Policy Website

Foreign relations of the European Union
European Union